John O'Grady (born July 14, 1954) is a former American football player and coach.
He served as the head football coach at the University of Wisconsin–River Falls from 1989 to 2010.

Head coaching record

Football

References

External links
 Wisconsin Football Coaches Association profile
 Wisconsin–Whitewater profile

1954 births
Living people
Wisconsin–River Falls Falcons football players
Wisconsin–River Falls Falcons football coaches
Wisconsin Badgers football coaches
Kent State Golden Flashes football coaches
Wisconsin–Oshkosh Titans football coaches
Wisconsin–Whitewater Warhawks football coaches